Geranyl diphosphate diphosphatase (EC 3.1.7.11, geraniol synthase', geranyl pyrophosphate pyrophosphatase) is an enzyme with systematic name geranyl-diphosphate diphosphohydrolase. This enzyme catalyses the following chemical reaction

 geranyl diphosphate + H2O  geraniol + diphosphate

This enzyme is isolated from Ocimum basilicum (basil) and Cinnamomum tenuipile (camphor tree).

References

External links 
 

EC 3.1.7